Chief Olusegun Osoba (born 15 July 1939) is a Nigerian journalist and politician who served twice as governor of Ogun State first from 1992 to 1993 during the Nigerian Third Republic and then from 1999 to 2003.

Early life and education
Olusegun Osoba was born to Mr. and Mrs. Jonathan Babatunde Osoba. Osoba attended a series of professional courses after high school graduation from Methodist Boys High School Lagos. He obtained a diploma in journalism at the University of Lagos and went for one-year course in the United Kingdom on the scholarship of the Commonwealth Press Union in 1967. In 1969, he was studying in Bloomington, USA at the Indiana University's department of journalism. In 1974 he won the Nieman Fellowship Award for journalism for years postgraduate study at Harvard University Cambridge, Massachusetts, USA. He is the first Nigerian to have won this prestigious Nieman Fellowship for Journalism.

Journalism
Osoba started his career in journalism in 1964 working with the Daily Times of Nigeria as a trainee reporter covering crime stories and by 1966, he was the diplomatic correspondent of the Times. He became news editor in 1968, deputy editor of the Sunday Times in 1971 and deputy editor of the Times in 1972. In August 1975, he became the editor of the Daily Times of Nigeria, then left the firm in November 1975 to take up the task of General Manager of the Ilorin based Nigerian Herald. He returned to the Times in 1984 as the managing director. Internationally, he worked as stringer or local correspondent for the British Broadcasting Corporation, The Times of London, Newsweek Magazine, and United Press International News Agency. He was the chairman of the Governing Board of the Nigerian Institute of Journalism and Member of the Executive Board of the International Press Institute representing Black-Africa from 1984-1992.
He was a member of the Nigerian Constituent Assembly in 1988. He is also member of the Commonwealth Press Union, London and the Nigerian Union of Journalist.

Political career
Osoba was elected on two occasions as Governor of Ogun State first from January 1992 until November 1993 with the Social Democratic Party (SDP). He was removed from office by Sani Abacha's administration on 17 November 1993. In the 1999 Ogun State gubernatorial election, he was elected again as governor with the Alliance for Democracy party (AD), holding office between May 1999 and May 2003.

He holds the National Honours of the Commander of the Order of the Niger CON. He is a member of the National Conference 2014. Even if Ogun State entirely will forget the impact of this politician, the Ipokia local government down to Wheke Akere will not forget his impact because he brought electricity into all communities around Maun Ward one and two.

Personal life
Osoba is married to Chief Aderinsola Osoba, the Beere Awujale of Ijebu. They are the parents of four children, two boys and two girls: Kemi, Olumide, Oluyinka and Tobi. Osoba holds the chieftaincy titles of the Akinrogun of Egbaland and the Aremo Awujale of Ijebu.

References

1941 births
Living people
Social Democratic Party (Nigeria) politicians
Alliance for Democracy (Nigeria) politicians
Governors of Ogun State
Yoruba politicians
University of Lagos alumni
Nigerian journalists
Yoruba journalists
Indiana University alumni
Methodist Boys' High School alumni
Nigerian editors
Nieman Fellows
People from Osogbo